Antonio Arenas Merino (July 13, 1808, Lima – December 27, 1891 ) was Peruvian politician. He served as the President of the Chamber of Deputies from 1860 to 1862, and President of the Constituent Congress from 1884 to 1885.
Arenas served as the Interim Caretaker of Peru, officially as the President of the Government Junta of Peru, from December 3, 1885 to July 5, 1886. He also served as Prime Minister of Peru on several occasions.

References

Politicians from Lima
Presidents of Peru
Presidents of the Congress of the Republic of Peru
Presidents of the Chamber of Deputies of Peru
19th-century Peruvian lawyers
1808 births
1891 deaths
Presidents of the Supreme Court of Peru
Freemasons